Lady Bay Bridge is a road bridge of two lanes that spans the River Trent in West Bridgford, Nottingham. It is the bridge following (downstream) from Trent Bridge and connects the main thoroughfare of Radcliffe Road (on the south side) with Meadow Lane (on the north side).

History
Originally, the bridge was the rail crossing for the Midland Railway from Melton Mowbray to Nottingham Station (formerly known as Nottingham Midland). When the Nottingham direct line of the Midland Railway was abandoned in 1968, plans were made to convert the river crossing and so relieve pressure on Trent Bridge. However, these works were not complete until 1979. The bridge had a complete re-paint from July 2010 to early 2011, carried out by Nottingham-based company "Enderby Hyland". However evidence of a bridge in this area goes back as far as the Saxons who crossed in the same area. Then in the 15th century, when it was decided to build a bridge in this area, they used the original arches of Lady Bay bridge dating back to the 15th century.

In the morning of 4 July 2022, a lorry crashed from the bridge striking a parapet and damaging the crash barrier. The bridge was closed for repairs, with one lane reopening on 11 July 2022 following the installation of temporary concrete barriers. The driver of the lorry suffered a broken arm. There were no further injuries.

In popular culture
The bridge was used as the location for an East-West Berlin river crossing in the 1982 TV Series Smiley's People, starring Sir Alec Guinness and based on the novel by John le Carre.

See also
List of crossings of the River Trent
Nottingham direct line of the Midland Railway

References

External links
 See Lady Bay Bridge on Google Street View.

Bridges in Nottingham
Bridges across the River Trent
Bridges completed in 1878
West Bridgford